Jeremy Michael Vujnovich (born October 12, 1990) is a former American football offensive guard. He played college football at Louisiana College. He was signed by the Green Bay Packers as an undrafted free agent in 2014 and has also been a member of the Indianapolis Colts, Arizona Cardinals, and Washington Redskins.

Professional career

Green Bay Packers
After going undrafted in the 2013 NFL Draft, Vujnovich signed with the Green Bay Packers on January 7, 2014. On August 30, 2014, he was released by the Packers during final team cuts. Vujnovich was signed to the Packers' practice squad the following day. On January 20, 2015, he was re-signed by the Packers after finishing the season on the practice squad.

On September 5, 2015, Vujnovich was released by the Packers during final team cuts for the second straight season. He was signed to the Packers' practice squad on September 7, 2015. On January 18, 2016, Vujnovich was re-signed by the Packers after finishing the season on the practice squad. He was released by the Packers on May 9, 2016.

Indianapolis Colts
Vujnovich was signed by the Indianapolis Colts on May 12, 2016. On September 3, 2016, he was waived by the Colts during final team cuts. Vujnovich was signed to the Colts' practice squad the next day. On October 1, 2016, he was promoted from the practice squad to the active roster. Vujnovich was waived by the Colts on October 13, 2016, and was signed to the practice squad the following day. He was promoted to the active roster on December 15, 2016.

Head coach Chuck Pagano named Vujnovich the starting left guard to begin the regular season and he started all 16 games in 2017. On September 1, 2018, Vujnovich was waived by the Colts.

Arizona Cardinals
On September 2, 2018, Vujnovich was claimed off waivers by the Arizona Cardinals. He played in five games, starting two, before being placed on injured reserve on September 29, 2018, after dealing with a hamstring injury throughout the season. On September 7, 2019, Vujnovich was released by the Cardinals, but was re-signed two days later. He was released again on September 21, 2019.

Washington Redskins
Vujnovich signed with the Washington Redskins on March 26, 2020, but was released on July 26, 2020.

References

External links
 Louisiana College bio
 

1990 births
Living people
Players of American football from Louisiana
People from Belle Chasse, Louisiana
American football offensive tackles
American football offensive guards
Louisiana Christian Wildcats football players
Green Bay Packers players
Indianapolis Colts players
Arizona Cardinals players
Washington Redskins players